François Guérin (1717–1801) was a French 18th century artist, miniaturist and draughtsman, working in pastels and oil. He was a member of the Académie de Saint-Luc an institution for those artists prevented for various reasons, from joining the more prestigious Académie royale de peinture et de sculpture. However, the work of the Academie de Saint-Luc was so far from second rate that following a successful exhibition in 1777, the Royal Academy took offence, and with the backing of the monarchy, issued an edict in March 1776 abolishing “guilds, brotherhoods, and communities of arts and crafts”, forcing the Academie de Saint-Luc to close. Guérin had, however, been accepted into the more prestigious academy by 1761.

Guérin's chief principal works were bust portraits and conversation pieces - small informal paintings of groups or couples shown within a domestic setting.

Life
Guérin is known to have had a son Thomas-François, but little more is reliably known. A 1748 portrait of Madame de Pompadour with her daughter indicates that he was active at Versailles in the  mid 18th century. However, a second portrait, painted in the late 1760s, once thought to be Pompadour in discussion with the Duc de Choiseul, is now thought to be of two anonymous sitters due to the work recording precisely the furnishings which were too unfashionable for a salon of either Choiseul or Pompadour.

Notes

References
MA Mutual Art (François Guérin) Retrieved 20 December 2019.
Tata (Conversation piece).Retrieved 20 December 2019
Ellis Waterhouse, Anthony Blunt; Paintings: The James A. de Rothschild Collection at Waddesdon Manor; Fribourg; Office du Livre, The National Trust; 1967.
Neil Jeffares: Dictionary of Pastellists before 1800 Retrieved 20 December 2019

1717 births
1801 deaths
18th-century French painters
French neoclassical painters
French portrait painters
Rococo painters
Pastel artists
Members of the Académie royale de peinture et de sculpture